Eracon is a genus of skipper butterflies in the family Hesperiidae.

Species
Recognised species in the genus Eracon include:
 Eracon sarahburnsae Grishin, 2014

References

Natural History Museum Lepidoptera genus database

Pyrgini
Hesperiidae genera
Taxa named by Frederick DuCane Godman
Taxa named by Osbert Salvin